Israel is competing at the 2013 World Championships in Athletics in Moscow, Russia, from 10–18 August 2013.
A team of 3 athletes represents the country in the event.

Results

(q – qualified, NM – no mark, SB – season best)

Men

Women

References

External links
IAAF World Championships – Athletes – Israel

Nations at the 2013 World Championships in Athletics
Athletics in Israel
2013 in Israeli sport
Israel at the World Championships in Athletics